Powhatan B. Locke (c. 1828 – June 12, 1868) was a justice of the Territorial Supreme Court of Nevada from August 1863 to August 1864.

Born in Kentucky, Locke's family moved to Missouri, where Locke entered the practice of law by 1850. He was elected mayor of Savannah, Missouri, in 1854, and reelected him in 1855. From 1862 to 1863, he served as the presiding judge in the county court in St. Joseph, Missouri.

In August, 1863, President Abraham Lincoln appointed Locke to a seat on the Territorial Supreme Court of Nevada vacated by the resignation of Justice Horatio M. Jones. The appointment was understood to be temporary, with Locke taking the oath of office in October 1963, and receiving his commission in January 1864.

As a judge, Locke rode circuit around a district comprising the counties of Storey, Washoe, and Roop. According to one account, "Locke drifted from parties and conferences with the representatives of one company to dinners and meetings with the minions of the other. Just when the Potosi thought it had won his vote he would be off with William Stewart and the other lawyers for the Chollar." Locke was described aas "obviously unfit for any position of responsibility." Accused of corruption, Locke and his fellow justices resigned from the court in August 1864.

Locke and his wife Tabitha had four children. Locke died of consumption in Louisiana, Missouri, around the age of 40.

References

1820s births
1868 deaths
Mayors of places in Missouri
Justices of the Nevada Supreme Court